Apios americana, sometimes called the American groundnut, potato bean, hopniss, Indian potato, hodoimo, America-hodoimo, cinnamon vine, or groundnut (not to be confused with other plants in the subfamily Faboideae sometimes known by that name) is a perennial vine that bears edible beans and large edible tubers.

Description
The flowers are usually pink, purple, or red-brown, and are produced in dense racemes  in length. In botanical terms, the tubers are rhizomatous stems, not roots.

Genetics 
The species is normally 2n=2x=22, diploid, but both diploid and triploid forms exist. Only diploids are capable of producing seeds; triploids will produce flowers but not seeds. Thus, triploids are entirely dependent on tuber division for propagation whereas diploids can be propagated through both seeds and tubers. Other than seed production, there are no easily identifiable differences between diploids and triploids. Triploids are generally found in the northern part of American groundnut's range whereas diploids predominate in the southern part of the range. Triploids have been identified in Canada (in New Brunswick, Quebec, and Ontario) and the United States (in Connecticut, Vermont, Massachusetts, New York, Pennsylvania, Ohio, New Hampshire, Rhode Island, Wisconsin, and Iowa). A few diploids have been found in the northeastern part of the range, such as along the Black River in Central Ontario. All samples tested in the Southeastern United States have been found to be diploid.

Distribution and habitat 
The plant's natural range is from southern Canada (including Ontario, Quebec, and New Brunswick) down through Florida and west as far as the border of Colorado.

Ecology 
The species is a larval host for the Epargyreus clarus.

Nitrogen fixation 
American groundnut fixes its own nitrogen, which could be a great advantage in comparison to other roots crops, such as potatoes, true yams, and sweet potatoes. These do not fix their own nitrogen and require large applications of nitrogen fertilizer. American groundnut can be nodulated by bacterial strains that are normally found in symbiosis with soybeans or cowpeas.

Research has been done on the potential of the soybean strain Bradyrhizobium japonicum to nodulate American groundnut. It was found that plants nodulated with B. japonicum yielded ~30% better than unnodulated plants if no nitrogen fertilizer was used. It was also determined that nodulated plants partitioned more carbon into non-edible shoots when they were given nitrogen fertilizer, whereas unnodulated plants responded to nitrogen fertilizer with greater tuber yields than nodulated plants. This data suggests that nitrogen fertilization may be required to maximize tuber size and yields in A. americana.

Cultivation

Domestication 
American groundnut is generally considered to be an undomesticated crop. In her 1939 description of the Native American use of American groundnut, Gretchen Beardsley states that several historical sources describe the "cultivation" of American groundnut by indigenous peoples. She dismisses the ambiguous term "cultivation" as perhaps referring to transplantation of tubers near a settlement. She quotes the historical author Waugh on this subject of cultivation: "sometimes planted in suitable locations, though they are not, strictly speaking, cultivated." Subsequent authors on the American groundnut have followed Beardsley's interpretation of "cultivation" when referring to the early use by Indigenous peoples of American groundnut. However, recent evidence suggests that North American indigenous peoples likely intervened significantly as cultivators of the native plants of the region, in a manner similar to contemporary Western permaculture practices. So, from a permacultural perspective, Native Americans may well have "cultivated" the groundnut.

In 1985, Dr. William J. Blackmon, Dr. Berthal D. Reynolds, and their colleagues at Louisiana State University in Baton Rouge, Louisiana, began a program of deliberate domestication of American groundnut. Their primary goal was to develop an American groundnut that can produce a significant yield in a single season. Early trials identified LA85-034 as a promising cultivar, with "elongate tubers of uniform, medium size with light brown skin and little extra rhizomatous material". By 1988, they had collected wild seeds and tubers from 210 plants found in 19 states, although the bulk of their selections came from the state of Louisiana. From these wild materials, and a small number of single crosses, they rigorously selected for plants that met their primary breeding goals of larger tuber size, denser tuber set, single season production, and productivity in untrellised cultivation. The American groundnut domestication program at Louisiana State University continued in various forms until the mid-1990s. Cultivars from this program can still occasionally be found available from small seed companies.

From 1985 to 1994, an Apios breeding program took place that resulted in the collection of over 200 wild accessions. These accessions underwent hybridization and selection, and over 2,200 lines were assessed. Of these lines, only 53 genotypes were kept for further analysis. Three different locations and three different growing conditions—field, pots, and grow-bags—were used. There was significant variation found among almost all of the 20 genotypes in the field growing condition. Inter-node length, plant vigor, and stem diameter during plant growth were positively correlated with the plant yield below ground. There were four distinct genotypic clusters found in this collection of Apios lines. This suggests that the plant has a good ability to adapt and grow in a wide variety of locations and conditions. Furthermore, the superior germplasm identified in this project may be suitable as cultivars, and will aid in further development of Apios lines as a crop.

The largest germplasm collection of A. americana cultivars today is found at Iowa State University under the direction of Dr. Steven Cannon. It is maintained there for scholarly and academic use. Research continues at Iowa State on the domestication of American groundnut.

Despite these efforts at domestication, the American groundnut remains largely uncultivated and underused in North America and Europe. There are challenges to breeding and domesticating this plant, as well. There seems to be a partial self-incompatibility with Apios breeding and manual pollinations, resulting in rare seed-sets. Disadvantages in Apios as a crop are its vining habit. The crop has small tuber size for most genotypes. The tuber plant is difficult to harvest because of the "beads on a string" arrangement on stolons, which extend for over a meter.

In Japan and South Korea 
The only place in the world today where American groundnuts are commercially farmed in any significant quantities is in Japan. Before the American groundnut was introduced to Japan, the people on the main island of Honshu and the northern island of Hokkaido were already familiar with a native, wild plant called hodoimo (A. fortunei), which was occasionally eaten as an emergency food. American groundnut was introduced, accidentally or deliberately, to Japan during the Meiji period (1868–1912). One theory is that it was accidentally brought to Japan as a stowaway weed among apple seedlings imported from North America. Another theory is that American groundnut may have been deliberately brought to Japan in the middle of the Meiji period as an ornamental flower.

It has become a culinary specialty of the Aomori Prefecture, where American groundnut agriculture is centered. It has been eaten there for more than one hundred years. Although American groundnut agriculture is primarily identified with agriculture in the Aomori prefecture, it is grown in the nearby prefectures of Akita and Miyagi as well. In addition, it is known to be grown in the southern part of Honshu in the Tottori prefecture. Radioactive testing records following the Fukushima nuclear disaster record cesium testing of American groundnut agricultural products in the central prefecture of Tochigi.

An important part of the spread and popularization of American groundnut consumption in Japan has been the efforts of Dr. Kiyochika Hoshikawa to promote the cultivation of this crop in Japan, and the flurry of scientific articles on the health benefits of eating American groundnut tubers. Japanese websites that sell American groundnut continue to emphasize its health benefits in their marketing efforts. There are reports of American groundnut cultivation in South Korea as well, where it is grown for its nutritional benefits.

Toxicity
Studies in rats suggest that raw tubers should not be consumed. They contain harmful protease inhibitors that are denatured by cooking.

Uses
The tubers and seeds can both be cooked and eaten.

By Indigenous peoples of the Americas
The tubers have traditionally been a staple food among most Indigenous peoples of the Americas within the natural range of the plant. In 1749, the travelling Swedish botanist Peter Kalm writes, "Hopniss or Hapniss was the Indian name of a wild plant, which they ate at that time... The roots resemble potatoes, and were boiled by the Indians who ate them instead of bread."  Strachey in 1612 recorded observations of the Indigenous peoples in Virginia: "In June, July, and August they feed upon roots of tockohow, berries, groundnutts, fish, and greene wheate..." In Eastern Canada, the Jesuit missionary, Le Jeune, observed  that the Indigenous peoples there would, "eat, besides, roots, such as the bulbs of the red lily; ... another that our French people call 'Rosary' because it is distinguished by tubers in the form of beads."  The early author Rafinesque observed that the Cree were cultivating the plant for both its tubers and seeds. The author Brinton wrote in 1885 in regards to the Lenape people, "Of wild fruits and plants they consumed the esculent and nutritious tubers on the roots of the Wild Bean, Apios tuberosa... which the Indians called hobbenis..."  In 1910, Parker writes that the Iroquois were consuming significant quantities of groundnuts up until about thirty years before his writing. The Paris Documents of 1666 record that the sixth tribe of the second division of the Iroquois were identified as, "that of the Potatoe, which they call Schoneschironon" and an illustration of tubers is found in the Paris Documents with the explanation, "This is the manner they paint the tribe of the Potatoe."  The author Gilmore records the use of groundnuts by the Caddoan and Siouan tribes of the Missouri river region, and the authors Prescott and Palmer record its use among the Sioux. The Indigenous peoples would prepare the tubers in many different ways, such as frying them in animal fat or drying them into flour. Many tribes peel them and dry them in the sun, such as the Menomini who have traditionally built scaffolds of cedar bark covered with mats to dry their tubers for winter use. The Menomini are recorded as having dried the tubers in maple syrup or making a preserve of Groundnut tubers by boiling them in maple syrup. The Potawatomi have traditionally boiled their tubers. The traditional Meskwaki and Chippewa preparation involves peeling, parboiling, slicing, and drying the tubers. The Chippewa have historically used them as a sort of seasoning in all their foods.

By Europeans
The Europeans learned to use the American groundnut from the Indigenous peoples of the Americas. As a result, the American groundnut became interwoven with the history of the American colonies and Europe. The early traveler John Brereton was sustained by the "good meat" and "medicinable" qualities of American groundnut during his travels in New England in 1602. In 1613, the followers of Biencourt at Port-Royal ate the tubers to help them survive in the New World. The American groundnut was an important factor in the survival of the Pilgrims during the first few winters of their settlement. In 1623 the Pilgrims, "having but a small quantity of corn left," were "enforced to live on groundnuts... and such other things that the country afforded... and were easily gotten..." The Pilgrims were taught to find and prepare American groundnut by the Wampanoag people. The groundnut was likely eaten at the harvest festival of November 1621 that is regarded as the first Thanksgiving, although only venison was specifically named as a food item at this meal by a Pilgrim eyewitness account.

Philosopher Henry David Thoreau commented on the nutty flavor and dry texture in October 1852.

It is believed that American groundnut may have been shipped to Europe as early as 1597. It was listed in 1885 as a European garden crop. In 1845 it was evaluated as a possible alternative potato crop in Ireland during the Great Famine. These early introductions to Europe appear to have resulted in little or no assimilation of the new food into the European diet. A primary reason for this lack of assimilation was that the two-year cycle for an acceptable tuber yield did not match the cropping systems that were familiar to Europeans.

Nutrition 
The tubers are highly palatable with culinary characteristics of a potato, although the flavor can be somewhat nuttier than a potato and the texture can be finer. These tubers contain roughly three times the protein content of a potato (16.5% by dry weight), and the amino acid balance is good with the exception of cysteine and methionine. However, A. americana had larger levels of genistein than the other two species. The fatty acid content of tubers is approximately 4.2% to 4.6%, with linoleic fatty acids predominating. The fresh weight of a tuber is 36% of carbohydrate (primarily starch). The tubers are also an excellent source of calcium and iron. Calcium content is tenfold greater than a potato and iron is twofold greater than a potato, although vitamin C was considerably less than a potato. The tuber and the flower also contain monosaccharides and oligosaccharides. The tuber has more of these types of carbohydrates than the soybean, potato, and sweet potato.

In addition, the tubers appear to have numerous health-promoting factors. Hypertensive rats that were fed powdered tubers as 5% of their total diet had a 10% decrease in blood pressure and also a reduction in cholesterol and triglycerides. It has been shown that the tubers contain genistein and other isoflavones that have various health benefits, including an anti-carcinogenic function against colon, prostate, and breast cancer.  Genistein-7-O-gentiobioside is a novel isoflavone that is found in the American groundnut. Extract from the American groundnut was shown to drive the anti-oxidative pathway in cells although it did not have anti-oxidative activity itself. Human breast carcinoma MCF-7 cells were pretreated with the extract of A. americana for 24 hours. Subsequent analysis showed an increase in expression of heme oxygenase-1, a protein induced during oxidative stress. The American groundnut, like soybean, is a great source of isoflavone.

Furthermore, a study on A. americana and its flower shows that the flower of the particular plant is not toxic to mice. Consumption of the flower was shown to lower plasma glucose levels in diabetic mice. The flower was shown to have an inhibitory activity on maltose and an anti-hyperglycemic effect in mice, suggesting that not only is it a viable and novel food source for the general population, but also in the prevention of diabetes.

References

External links

Domestication of Apios americana
Plants for a future database
Apios americana at the USDA Plants database
Hopniss: North America's best wild tuber?
Orion magazine article
Wired magazine - How We Can Tame Overlooked Wild Plants to Feed the World

Phaseoleae
Edible legumes
Plants used in Native American cuisine
Root vegetables
Perennial vegetables
Flora of the Northeastern United States
Flora of the Southeastern United States
Flora of the Great Lakes region (North America)
Flora of the United States
Plants described in 1753
Taxa named by Carl Linnaeus
Flora without expected TNC conservation status